The Toronto Comic Con was an annual comic book convention held in Toronto, Ontario, Canada. It started in 2003 and was sold in 2009 to Wizard Entertainment owner Gareb Shamus. It was subsequently relaunched as a Wizard event in 2010. The event has been on hiatus since spring 2012.

From 2003-2007 the subtitle for the event was "A Celebration of Comic Books, Graphic Novels, Manga and Sequential Art". During those years the event was scheduled to run over three days (Friday through Sunday). In 2008 the convention was a two-day event (Saturday and Sunday).

Events 
Features have included: exhibitor room for commercial selling of related goods, a corporate area for companies to promote their projects, an Artist Alley area for comic book creators, a guest area for invited guests of the convention, panel room for discussions on various aspects of comic books and creators, workshops and children's programming. In previous years the convention was the home to additional special events programming such as Women of Comics Symposium and the Joe Shuster Awards.

History 
Staff from Paradise Comics, a Toronto comic book store, put on one-day comic book conventions in Toronto starting in the early 1990s.  In November 2003, they held their first three-day event. In 2004, it was held in mid-June. In 2005 and 2006, it was held in late April.  In 2007, it was held in June, and in 2008, it was held in mid-July (July 12–13, 2008). On occasion, Paradise has also held one-day shows at the Hilton and Holiday Inn on King (now the Toronto Hyatt Regency).

From 2003–2007, the convention was held at the National Trade Centre (now called the Direct Energy Centre, located at Exhibition Place (home of the historic Canadian National Exhibition).

In July 2007, in a controversial move, Paradise Conventions co-owner and organizer Kevin Boyd resigned from/abandoned the convention to work for Hobbystar Marketing as the Canadian guest and programming coordinator for Fan Expo Canada and other Toronto ComiCON events. Boyd claimed at the time that "The convention business was not successful so I decided it was time to end it. I worked on it for five years and did not receive any money for time spent on the big convention."

In 2008 it moved to the Holiday Inn on King, a  smaller venue (21,000 square feet) that is closer to downtown Toronto.

In 2009, it was announced that the show would be on hiatus in 2009 due to scheduling concerns.

On June 24, 2009, via press release, Gareb Shamus, owner of Wizard Entertainment, announced that he had purchased the event from Paradise owner Peter Dixon, who would remain involved in the show in some form, in a manner similar to Wizard's purchase of the Big Apple Comic Con. The former comic book-only show will be retooled as a multi-genre event similar to other Wizard events in Philadelphia, Chicago, and New York, and relaunched in 2010.

The convention seems to be officially on hiatus, as there have been no new events since 2012. In June 2014 Paradise launched a new semi-monthly one day show called the "Toronto Comics Show" and held them in a room at the Leaside Arena. Those are also currently on hiatus since Fall 2014.

Dates and locations
2003: March 23 — Toronto Hilton Hotel
2003: November 7–9 — Queen Elizabeth Building, National Trade Centre
2004: June 18–20 — Queen Elizabeth Building, National Trade Centre
2005: April 29–30, May 1 — Hall F, National Trade Centre
2006: April 28–30 — Hall C, National Trade Centre
2007: June 8–10 — Hall C, Direct Energy Centre 
2008: July 12–13 — 2nd Floor, Holiday Inn on King (Last Paradise event)
2010: March 26–28 — Hall A, Direct Energy Centre (First Wizard event)
2011: March 18–20 — Hall D, Direct Energy Centre
2012: April 14–15 — Metro Toronto Convention Center, North Building

Guests of Honour
2003 Jim Starlin and Michael William Kaluta
2004 Will Eisner and Dave Sim
2005 Brian Michael Bendis, Warren Ellis and Jerry Robinson
2006 George Pérez and David Lloyd
2007 Michael Golden, Terry Moore, Marv Wolfman and Matt Wagner
2008 Herb Trimpe, Joseph Michael Linsner, Greg Land

References

External links
Official web site

Comics conventions in Canada